Infocap, Training of the Populace Institute, described as "the university of the worker," is an institution created by the Society of Jesus and inspired by the thought of Alberto Hurtado. Its mission is to train and educate workers.

History 
Infocap was established in the early eighties when Chile had high unemployment and few training opportunities. This led the Society of Jesus to create a training institution for technical workers. In 1990 the institution moved to its current headquarters located at Av. Departmental 440, San Joaquin.

References

Jesuit development centres
Educational organisations based in Chile
Catholic schools in Chile
Vocational schools
Vocational education in South America
1984 establishments in Chile
Organizations established in 1984